The South African Railways Class 23 4-8-2 was a class of South African steam locomotives.

In 1938 and 1939, the South African Railways placed 136 Class 23 steam locomotives in service. The Class 23 was the last and the largest 4-8-2 Mountain type locomotive to be designed by the South African Railways.

Manufacturers
The Class 23 4-8-2 Mountain type steam locomotive was designed by W.A.J. Day, Chief Mechanical Engineer (CME) of the South African Railways (SAR) from 1936 to 1939. It was intended as a general utility locomotive, capable of operating on  rail, and was built in two batches by Berliner Maschinenbau and Henschel and Son in Germany. The original order in 1938 was for twenty locomotives, of which Berliner built seven, numbered in the range from 2552 to 2558, and Henschel thirteen, numbered in the range from 2559 to 2571.

At the time, the urgency brought about by the rapidly deteriorating political climate in Europe led to a further 116 locomotives being ordered even before the first batch could be delivered and tested, contrary to usual SAR practice. Ordering this quantity of a new class of engine before any had been tried out constituted a record for the SAR. Of this second batch, Henschel built 85, numbered in the range from 3201 to 3285, and Berliner 31, numbered in the range from 3286 to 3316. The last locomotive of this second order was delivered in August 1939, just one month before the outbreak of the Second World War.

Berliner-built locomotive no. 3301 received an out-of-sequence works number, Berliner no. 10816 instead of no. 11000, since works number 11000 was reserved for the new Class 01.10 4-6-2 Pacific type locomotive for the German State Railways.

Characteristics
In general appearance and power, the Class 23 locomotive is very similar to the Classes 15E and 15F. As originally designed, the locomotive would have had  coupled wheels which would have required a newly designed boiler to accommodate the extra length brought about by the long coupled wheelbase. The increasing political turmoil in Europe and the resulting urgency, however, prohibited time being spent on designing a new boiler. This boiler was one of the range of standard type boilers which was designed by Day's predecessor as CME, A.G. Watson, as part of the latter's standardisation policy.

The locomotives were delivered without smoke deflectors, but after the war they were fitted with standard elephant ear smoke deflectors based upon the Deutsche Reichsbahn design.

The inner firebox was of steel and was fitted with five  diameter arch tubes, which supported the brick arch. The rocking grate, with two drop-grates, was actuated by a steam shaker. As was the practice with Watson Standard boilers, the hopper type ashpan was secured to the main frames instead of to the boiler foundation ring, with a  air gap all round. Drench pipes were fitted to facilitate cleaning and the bottom of the ashpan was fitted with a hand-operated sliding door.

To enable them to negotiate  radius curves, the leading coupled wheels were given a  total side-play in their horn blocks, while the tyre flanges of the intermediate coupled wheels were of reduced thickness and the leading coupling rods were provided with spherical bearings at the knuckle joints and crank pins.

Tender
Since these locomotives were intended for working in the Karoo where good quality water is a scarce resource, they were equipped with very large Type EW tenders which rode on six-wheeled bogies to enable longer runs to be undertaken between watering stops or to skip bad watering places. The first batch of twenty locomotives were delivered with such tenders.

The second batch of 116 locomotives were delivered with a modification to the tender's underframe. To improve the weight distribution, both tender pivot centres were relocated  towards the rear.

Four vacuum cylinders operated clasp brakes on all tender wheels and a hand brake was included. Since experience showed that a firegrate of  cannot be served effectively under all conditions by manual stoking, particularly on long runs, a type H.T-1 mechanical stoker was fitted, supplied by the Standard Stoker Company of America. The mechanical stoker engine was mounted on the tender.

Streamlining
During the 1930s, the streamlining of locomotives was fashionable in Europe and the United States of America. It was proposed to adopt streamlining on some of the Class 23 locomotives which were intended for the Cape mainline and the manufacturers were requested to submit estimates to that effect.

Locomotive naming
Although the naming of locomotives in South Africa dates back to the Cape Town Railway and Dock Company's 0-4-2 locomotives of 20 March 1860 and the Natal Railway's 0-4-0WT Natal of 13 May 1860, it was rarely done. In 1945, the Minister of Transport at the time, the Honourable F.C. Sturrock MP, instructed that a number of Classes 15F and 23 engines should be named after various South African cities and towns and fitted with suitable nameplates in both official languages. The decorative plates were fitted to the sides of the smokebox or to the elephant ear smoke deflectors of engines which were so equipped. Thirteen Class 23 locomotives were named.

 No. 3273 - City of Cape Town
 No. 3277 - City of Pietermaritzburg
 No. 3278 - Newcastle
 No. 3279 - Worcester
 No. 3280 - Oudtshoorn
 No. 3289 - City of East London
 No. 3303 - City of Grahamstown
 No. 3311 - City of Kimberley
 No. 3312 - Upington
 No. 3313 - City of Port Elizabeth
 No. 3314 - Uitenhage
 No. 3315 - City of Durban
 No. 3316 - Ladysmith

In later years, some of these names migrated to other engines and classes, several eventually ending up on Class 25NC locomotives. Other names were also added later and, for example, by 1969 no. 3229 bore the name Springs.

Service
The new class soon formed the bulk of the motive power on the lines from Touws River to Beaufort West and from De Aar to Welverdiend via Kimberley and Klerksdorp.

When new, a few Class 23s were briefly allocated to Braamfontein to haul the Union Limited and other Cape express passenger trains from Johannesburg, and the Class 16DA and Class 16E were transferred to Bloemfontein. Since the electric turntable at Braamfontein could not accommodate the locomotive and its long Type EW tender, engines coming in from Klerksdorp had to detach at Johannesburg station and run light to India Junction near Germiston to be turned on the triangular junction. The Braamfontein Class 23s were therefore soon transferred to the Cape Northern System and Braamfontein was provided with Class 15Fs that could fit onto its turntable.

Upon the arrival of the new Classes 25 and 25NC in 1953, the Class 23 was transferred to Bloemfontein to work south from there to Noupoort and Burgersdorp. Occasionally they worked north to Kroonstad and west across to Kimberley, but the Class 15F generally did most of that work.

When ore traffic from Postmasburg to Durban began to increase in the late 1950s, caboose-working was instituted c. 1959. Block loads of manganese ore were worked by steam over the route from Postmasburg via Kimberley and Bloemfontein to Kroonstad and four block loads were dispatched from Postmasburg to Maydon Wharf in Durban every 24 hours, seven days per week. Four crews on a pair of Class 23 locomotives with a caboose attached for crew accommodation worked in 21-day cycles out of Bloemfontein. The crews were supposed to work eight hours on and eight hours off, but by agreement they usually worked twelve-hour shifts instead.

Each caboose-working cycle began with the picking up of a string of 34 empty hopper wagons and a guard's van in Bloemfontein. These were worked through to Postmasburg, with the engines recoaling at Kamfersdam outside Kimberley. At Postmasburg they picked up 34 loaded hopper wagons and a guard's van, an approximate load of 2,700 tons, and worked all the way through to Kroonstad, where the loads were re-marshalled into 1,500 ton bites for the 1 in 66 (1½%) grades east of there to Harrismith. At Kroonstad the loaded hoppers were exchanged for empties and the whole cycle repeated. Recoaling points were at Postmasburg, Kamfersdam, Hamilton and Kroonstad and en route rewatering points were at Kloofeind and Glen. It took roughly two days to complete a loaded-empty cycle over the full route and an average of ten cycles were managed on each three-week tour of duty. Caboose-working was always with pairs of Class 23 locomotives, until the Class 25 condensers took over the section from Postmasburg to Kamfers Dam c. 1962 and the practice was discontinued. After electrification of the Postmasburg branch late in 1966, steam only came on at Beaconsfield and crews and engines were once more being changed in the traditional manner at Bloemfontein, Kroonstad and Bethlehem.

They were all retired by 1983, many of them in the process donating their large Type EW tenders to increase the range of the Class 15F. At least one of these tenders, that of no. 3209, was later rebuilt to a water-only tender.

Works numbers
The table shows the Class 23 engine numbers, builders and works numbers. On the builders' works lists, all the locomotives are recorded as having been built in 1938.

Preservation
Two of these locomotives still exist:

Illustration
The main picture shows Berliner-built no. 2556 which was plinthed next to the High School in Gideon Joubert Park in Touws River on occasion of that Railway town's centenary in 1977. It was officially presented to the town on 24 September 1977 by SAR chief executive Dr. Kobus Loubser.

References

2050
2050
2050
4-8-2 locomotives
2D1 locomotives
Berliner locomotives
Henschel locomotives
Cape gauge railway locomotives
Railway locomotives introduced in 1938
1938 in South Africa